Zaraki (also Romanized as Zarakī and Zarākī) is a village in Shuil Rural District, Rahimabad District, Rudsar County, Gilan Province, Iran. At the 2006 census, its population was 95, in 25 families.

References 

Populated places in Rudsar County